This is a list of professional and semi-professional sports teams based in the New York metropolitan area, including from New York City, Long Island, Lower Hudson Valley, Northern and Central New Jersey, and parts of Western Connecticut.  The collective area has a population of over twenty million people, making it the largest in the United States and among the top ten in the world.  It also has the greatest concentration of professional sports teams of any region in the country with teams in all of the major sports and leagues in baseball, basketball, football, hockey, lacrosse, and soccer.

All of the major pro franchises are found within the five boroughs of New York City or approximately thirty miles of the center of Manhattan, near mass transit and highway access.  These teams are part of the global New York City media market.  Though some are based in New Jersey or Long Island, in proximity to Manhattan, the teams receive national and international media coverage generally defining them as dually being part of their location of origin (town or city, and state) and primarily the New York City - New York metropolitan area.  Having acquired exclusive territorial rights in their respective leagues of the region or up to fifty to seventy-five miles of their base, teams can receive local broadcasting within this range, and have say over sharing rights with other teams.  This range theoretically encompasses the bounds of the New York metropolitan area and the recognition of the teams belonging to and representing the entire region.

Other division league franchises, either found within or outside of the thirty mile New York City media market range, are mostly associated by their town or city, and state, rather than the whole metropolitan area, while still belonging to it. Media coverage varies locally.  Collegiate teams are similarly identified with their location.  Still, they are acknowledged and principally followed by the name of their schools, and receive local and national coverage depending on their division, conference, sport, standing, and popularity.

Major sports teams
The New York metropolitan area is home to some of the country's top professional teams and leagues.  They are the following:

Baseball

Major League Baseball
 New York Mets, National League East, Citi Field, Queens
 New York Yankees, American League East, Yankee Stadium, Bronx

Basketball

National Basketball Association
 Brooklyn Nets, Atlantic Division, Eastern Conference, Barclays Center, Brooklyn
 New York Knicks, Atlantic Division, Eastern Conference, Madison Square Garden, Manhattan

American football

National Football League

 New York Giants, NFC East, MetLife Stadium, East Rutherford, New Jersey
 New York Jets, AFC East, MetLife Stadium, East Rutherford, New Jersey

Ice hockey

National Hockey League

 New Jersey Devils, Metropolitan Division, Eastern Conference, Prudential Center, Newark, New Jersey
 New York Islanders, Metropolitan Division, Eastern Conference, UBS Arena,Elmont, New York
 New York Rangers, Metropolitan Division, Eastern Conference,  Madison Square Garden, Manhattan

Soccer

Major League Soccer
 New York City FC, Eastern Conference, Yankee Stadium, Bronx
 New York Red Bulls, Eastern Conference, Red Bull Arena, Harrison, New Jersey

Box Lacrosse

National Lacrosse League

 New York Riptide, Eastern Conference, Nassau Coliseum, Uniondale, New York

Rugby Union

Major League Rugby
 Rugby New York, Eastern Conference, Mount Vernon Memorial Stadium, Mount Vernon, New York

Detailed summary by team

Other professional sports teams
The New York metropolitan area is also home to a variety of pro or semi-pro sports teams in the minor leagues, women's leagues, indoor leagues, and more.

Baseball

Atlantic League of Professional Baseball
 Long Island Ducks, Bethpage Ballpark, Central Islip, New York
 Staten Island FerryHawks, SIUH Community Park, Staten Island

Double-A Northeast
 Somerset Patriots, TD Bank Ballpark, Bridgewater, New Jersey

Frontier League
 New Jersey Jackals, Hinchliffe Stadium, Paterson, New Jersey
 New York Boulders, Clover Stadium, Pomona, New York
 Sussex County Miners, Skylands Stadium, Augusta, New Jersey

High-A East
 Brooklyn Cyclones, MCU Park, Brooklyn
 Jersey Shore BlueClaws, FirstEnergy Park, Lakewood, New Jersey

Basketball

WNBA
 New York Liberty, Barclays Center, Brooklyn, New York

NBA G League
 Long Island Nets, Nassau Veterans Memorial Coliseum, Uniondale, New York
 Westchester Knicks, Westchester County Center, White Plains, New York

Football

Women's Football Alliance
 New York Sharks, Aviator Sports Complex, Brooklyn

Ice hockey

Premier Hockey Federation 
 Metropolitan Riveters, American Dream Meadowlands, East Rutherford, New Jersey

Roller Derby

Men's Roller Derby Association
 New York Shock Exchange, Skate Safe America, Old Bethpage, New York
 Connecticut Death Quads, Ron-A-Roll Skating Center, Waterbury, Connecticut

Women's Flat Track Derby Association
 CT RollerGirls, Naugatuck, Connecticut
 Gotham Roller Derby, Hunter Sportsplex, Manhattan, New York
 Jersey Shore Roller Girls, Asbury Park Convention Hall, Asbury Park, New Jersey
 Long Island Roller Rebels, Skate Safe America, Old Bethpage, New York
 Suburbia Roller Derby, EJ Murray Memorial Skating Center; and Yonkers Police Athletic League, Yonkers, New York

Rugby league

American National Rugby League
 Connecticut Wildcats, Andrews Field, Norwalk, Connecticut
 New York Knights, Pier 40 at Hudson River Park, New York, New York
 New York Raiders, Rockland Lake State Park, Congers, New York

USA Rugby League
 New Haven Warriors, Ken Strong Stadium, West Haven, Connecticut

Rugby union

Major League Rugby
 Rugby United New York, MCU Park, Brooklyn

Soccer

National Women's Soccer League (NWSL)
 NJ/NY Gotham FC, Red Bull Arena, Harrison, New Jersey

USL Championship
 Queensboro FC, New York College stadium, Jamaica — starts play in 2023

MLS Next Pro
 New York Red Bulls II, MSU Soccer Park, Montclair, New Jersey

National Independent Soccer Association (NISA)
 New York Cosmos, Mitchel Athletic Complex, Uniondale, New York

Top tier amateur sports teams
The New York metropolitan area is home to many top tier amateur teams as well.

USL League Two 
 Brooklyn Knights, Metropolitan Oval, Queens
 Connecticut FC Azul, Reese Stadium, New Haven, Connecticut
 Central Jersey Spartans, Ben Cohen Turf Field, Lawrenceville, New Jersey
 F.A. Euro - New York Magic, Aviator Sports and Recreation, Brooklyn
 Jersey Express S.C., Lubetkin Field at J. Malcolm Simon Stadium, Newark, New Jersey
 Long Island Rough Riders, Mitchel Athletic Complex, Hempstead, New York
 NJ-LUSO Rangers FC, Morris Catholic High School Stadium, Denville, New Jersey
 Westchester Flames, City Park Stadium, New Rochelle, New York
 Cedar Stars Rush, University Stadium, Teaneck, New Jersey

National Premier Soccer League 
 Brooklyn Italians, John Dewey High School, Brooklyn
 FC Monmouth, Count Basie Park, Red Bank, New Jersey
 FC Motown, Ranger Stadium, Madison, New Jersey
 New Jersey Copa FC, St. John Vianney High School, Holmdel Township, New Jersey
 New York Athletic Club S.C., NYAC Travers Island Athletic Field, Pelham, New York
 New York Cosmos B, Mitchel Athletic Complex, Uniondale, New York

W-League 
 Hudson Valley Quickstrike Lady Blues, Newburgh Free Academy HS Stadium, Newburgh, New York
 Long Island Rough Riders (W-League), Cy Donnelly Stadium, Huntington, New York
 New Jersey Wildcats, Mercer County Community College Stadium, West Windsor, New Jersey
 New York Magic, Mazzella Field, New Rochelle, New York
 North Jersey Valkyries, DePaul Catholic High School Field, Wayne, New Jersey

Women's Premier Soccer League 
 Connecticut Football Club Passion (CFC Passion), Hamden Hall Country Day School Field, Hamden, Connecticut
 FC Westchester Elite, Loucks Stadium at White Plains High School, White Plains, New York
 Long Island Fury, Mitchel Athletic Complex, Hempstead, New York
 New Jersey Blaze, Rowland Park, Cranbury Township, New Jersey
 New York Athletic Club WFC, NYAC Travers Island Athletic Field, Pelham, New York
 Yankee Lady FC, Dalling Field at Saint Joseph High School Field, Trumbull, Connecticut

See also
Sports in New York City

References

 Teams
Sports in New Jersey
Sports in Connecticut
teams